Jerome "Kid" Coffee (born March 16, 1958) is an American former boxer in the bantamweight division.

Amateur career
Coffee had an outstanding amateur career and won several national championships, Amateur record 205 fights 193 wins (or 185–8 by the May 5, 1980 estimate) including:
1977 National AAU Flyweight champion, decisioning Ronnie Clifford of Hickory Hills, Illinois, in the final.
1978 National PAL Flyweight champion
1979 National PAL Flyweight champion
1979 Pan American Games bronze medalist
Defeated Gilberto Román (Mexico) points
Defeated Jorge Hernández (Cuba) points
Lost to Pedro Nolasco (Dominican Republic) points
1979 National Golden Gloves Flyweight champion
He was ranked #3 Flyweight amateur boxer in the world by the AIBA.

Professional career
Coffee turned professional in 1980 and had great success. He won his first 26 bouts, leading up to a clash with Australian Jeff Fenech for the IBF bantamweight title in 1985 in Sydney, Australia. Fenech retained his title over Coffee via unanimous decision after the bout went the full 15 rounds. Coffee retired in 1994.

References

1958 births
Living people
Boxers from Tennessee
Sportspeople from Nashville, Tennessee
National Golden Gloves champions
Winners of the United States Championship for amateur boxers
American male boxers
Boxers at the 1979 Pan American Games
Pan American Games bronze medalists for the United States
Pan American Games medalists in boxing
Bantamweight boxers
Medalists at the 1979 Pan American Games